The 23rd annual Webby Awards were held at Cipriani Wall Street in New York City on May 14, 2018, which was hosted by comedian and writer Amber Ruffin. The Webby Awards have been dubbed the "internet's highest honor" and, in 2018, received over 13,000 entries from 70 countries, with 10% receiving nominations.

Winners

(from http://webbyawards.com/winners/2018/)

References
Winners and nominees are generally named according to the organization or website winning the award, although the recipient is, technically, the web design firm or internal department that created the winning site and in the case of corporate websites, the designer's client.  Web links are provided for informational purposes, both in the most recently available archive.org version before the awards ceremony and, where available, the current website.  Many older websites no longer exist, are redirected, or have been substantially redesigned.

External links
Official site

2018
2018 awards in the United States
2018 in New York City
May 2018 events in the United States
2018 in Internet culture